Senators by right were non-elected members of the Belgian Senate.

If the ruling monarch of Belgium had any children, all of them who were older than eighteen years could opt to sit in senate, as senators by right; if the current monarch had no offspring, the descendants of the branch of the royal house called on to reign were senators by right instead.

Theoretically, senators by right were entitled to vote in the Senate once they reached the age of 21. However, by constitutional convention they did not use this right. Their presence was also disregarded when calculating the quorum; to reach the quorum, 36 of the 71 elected senators had to be present. Until 2013, Prince Philippe, Princess Astrid and Prince Laurent were senators by right. When Prince Philippe became King, there were no senators by right.

As part of the sixth Belgian state reform, the function of senators by right was abolished effective as of the May 2014 elections.

List
The following people have been senators by right between 1831 and 2014:
 Prince Leopold, later King Leopold II from 9 April 1853 until 16 December 1865;
 Prince Albert, later King Albert I from 13 November 1906 until 23 December 1906;
 Prince Leopold, later King Leopold III from 8 November 1927 until 23 February 1934;
 Prince Albert, later King Albert II from 11 March 1958 until 9 August 1993;
 Prince Philippe, later King Philippe from 21 June 1994 until 21 July 2013;
 Princess Astrid from 20 November 1996 until 21 July 2013;
 Prince Laurent from 31 May 2000 until 21 July 2013.

References

+